The Archdeacon of Llandaff is a senior ecclesiastical officer in the Church in Wales Diocese of Llandaff. The archdeacon is the senior priest with responsibility over the area of the archdeaconry of Llandaff, one of three archdeaconries in the diocese (the others are Margam and Morgannwg). The archdeaconry of Llandaff currently consists of five deaneries: Cardiff, Llandaff, Merthyr Tydfil & Caerphilly, Pontypridd, and Penarth & Barry.

History
The first recorded archdeacons of Llandaff occur soon after the Norman Conquest. However, no territorial titles are recorded until after . Until 1843, when the separate position of Dean of Llandaff was created, the Archdeacon also performed the duties of cathedral dean.

List of archdeacons of Llandaff

 Leofric
 1059-1104 Abraham
 Urban I
 1126 Uhtred
 1140–1148 Urban II
 c.1154–1159 Ralph
 1165–1179 William
 1172–1179 Urban III
 1217–1242 Maurice
 1243 Ralph of Newcastle
 1244 Thomas, the king's chaplain
 1260 Nicholas
 1260–c1287 Simon of Radnor
 1287 Robert de Briouze
 1289 Henry de Cranborne or Wager
 1290 Robert
 1323,1337 Alexander de Monmouth
 1338 Richard de Halton
 1347 Thomas de Burgherssh
 ?–1361 John de Coventry
 1361,1364 Henry Despenser
 1361–1368 Robert de Walsham
 1363–? Thomas Banastre of Eltisley
 1366 Thomas de Southam
 1368–? Richard Boule
 ?–1373 Thomas de Alston
 1373–? John de Sulthorn
 1385,1393 Robert de la More
 1396–? Thomas Orewelle
 ?-1447 Robert Cole
 1447–1454 John Stradling
 1454–? Lewis Byford
 1529,1541 John Quarre
 ?–1564 John Smith
 1564–? Giles Langley>
 1601 Cadwalader Hughes
1626-1646 Thomas Pritchard
 1646 John Clegge
 166û–1667 Francis Davies (afterwards Bishop of Llandaff, 1667)
 1668 Edward Gamage
 Edward Gamage Jnr
 Thomas Gamage
 1686-1705 George Bull (afterwards Bishop of St David's, 1705)
 1706-1722 William Watts
 1722-1749 John Evans
 1749–1777 John Fulham
 1777–1789 William Adams
 1789–? John Porter
 c.1796–1843 John Probyn (also Dean of Llandaff)
 1843–1857 Thomas Williams (afterwards Dean of Llandaff, 1857)
 1857–1859 James Colquhoun Campbell (afterwards Bishop of Bangor, 1859)
 1859–?1877 Henry Lynch Blosse
 1877-1897 John Griffiths
 1897–1913 Frederic Edmondes
 1913–1924 James Buckley
 1924–1930 David Davies
 1930–1938 John James
 1938–1953 Richard Jones
 1953–1964 Gwynno James (afterwards Dean of Brecon, 1964)
 1965–1969 Thomas Hughes, Assistant Bishop
 1969–1971 John Williams
 1971–1977 Alun Davies (afterwards Dean of Llandaff, 1977)
 1977–1988 Lewis Clarke
 1988–1991 Albert Lewis
 1991–1997 (ret.) David Lee
 1998–2008 (ret.) Bill Thomas
 31 May 2009July 2021 Peggy Jackson
5 September 2021present Rod Green

References

Llandaff